This is a list containing the Billboard Hot Latin Tracks number-ones of 1990.

References

United States Latin Songs
1990
1990 in Latin music